Sława Przybylska-Krzyżanowska (born 2 November 1932 in Międzyrzec Podlaski, Poland) is a Polish singer who became popular in 1957 with the song Pamiętasz była jesień ("Do you remember, it was autumn...")  Before her musical career, she graduated from art school and then studied foreign trade at the Central School of Foreign Service.

Polish President Aleksander Kwaśniewski awarded her the Officer's Cross of the Order of Polonia Restituta.

Selected songs
Ach panie panowie
Gdzie są kwiaty z tamtych lat?
Krakowska kwiaciarka
Pamiętasz była jesień
Piosenka o okularnikach
Słodkie fiołki
Widzisz mała
Tango bolero
Ciao, ciao bambina
Gorąca noc
Tango notturno
Patrzę na twoją fotografię
Pensylwania!!!
Na Francuskiej
Przyjdzie dzień
Droga na Smoleńsk
Już nigdy!

References

1932 births
Living people
Polish women singers
People from Międzyrzec Podlaski
Knights of the Order of Polonia Restituta